"Too Hot ta Trot" is a song by R&B/funk band, the Commodores. The song is written in E major.

The track on their 1977 live album Commodores Live!, and it spent a week at number one on the R&B singles chart and peaked at number twenty-four on the Billboard Hot 100 in early 1978.

Record World called it a "thumping funk exercise from a live lp."

Personnel
 William "WAK" King – trumpet, rhythm guitar, synthesizer, vocals
 Walter Orange – vocals, drums, keyboards
 Milan Williams – keyboards, trombone, rhythm guitar
 Thomas McClary – lead guitar
 Lionel Richie – vocals, saxophone, piano, drums
 Ronald LaPread – bass guitar, trumpet

Chart performance

Use in film
The song was featured on the soundtrack for (and performed in) the movie, Thank God It's Friday.

References

External links
https://www.discogs.com/Commodores-Live/release/412496

1978 songs
1978 singles
Commodores songs